James Neagle (1760?–1822) was a British engraver. Very largely a line engraver of book illustrations, he was prolific of designs by Thomas Stothard, Robert Smirke, Henry Fuseli, Gavin Hamilton, Henry Singleton, Richard Cook, and other popular artists.

Life
Neagle went to the Royal Academy Schools in 1786. He had many commissions from the publishing firm of Cadell & Davies. In 1801, in a civil action brought by Jean Marie Delattre the engraver against John Singleton Copley, over a plate, Neagle was a witness for the plaintiff. Towards the end of his life (after 1816) he emigrated to America, where he died not long afterwards in 1822.

Works

Neagle's work included plates for:

 John Boydell's and other editions of Shakespeare, including plates after Francis Wheatley;
 John Sharpe's and Charles Cooke's series of English Classics;
 Edward Forster's Arabian Nights, 1802; 
 Gil Blas, 1809, translated by Benjamin Heath Malkin; 
 Ancient Terra-Cottas in the British Museum, 1810, by Taylor Combe; and 
 James Cavanah Murphy's Arabian Antiquities of Spain, 1816.

A major work was The Royal Procession in St. Paul's on St. George's Day, 1789, from a drawing by Edward Dayes.

Family
Neagle had a son, John B. Neagle (died 1866), who practised as an engraver in Philadelphia.

Notes

Attribution

1760 births
1822 deaths
British engravers